was mayor of Hiroshima from 1922 to 1925.

1874 births
1964 deaths
Mayors of Hiroshima